Ri Song-gun (20 April 1950 – 22 September 2012) is a North Korean football manager.

Career
Ri was the head coach of the North Korea women's national team at the 2003 FIFA Women's World Cup.

References

External links
 
 
 Ri Song-gun at Soccerdonna.de 

1950 births
2012 deaths
North Korean football managers
Women's association football managers
North Korea women's national football team managers
2003 FIFA Women's World Cup managers